Eugene Visscher (November 23, 1940 – August 6, 2022) was an American college basketball coach. He was the head coach at Weber State University from 1971 to 1974 and at Northern Arizona University from 1981 to 1983.

A native of Muskegon, Michigan, he died in Michigan at the age of 81 on August 6, 2022.

References

External links 
 

1940 births
2022 deaths
Sportspeople from Muskegon, Michigan
American men's basketball players
Weber State Wildcats men's basketball players
American men's basketball coaches
Weber State Wildcats men's basketball coaches
Northern Arizona Lumberjacks men's basketball coaches
Basketball players from Michigan
Basketball coaches from Michigan